The Lord of the Rings: The White Council is an unreleased role-playing video game that started development at EA Redwood Shores.  It was to be based on the high fantasy novel  The Lord of the Rings  by J. R. R. Tolkien, however on February 2, 2007, EA announced that the game had been put on an indefinite hiatus, and to date no further information has been released.

Development
Project Gray Company was the game's working title, which was to be a new offering in EA’s series of videogames inspired by Tolkien’s books and Jackson’s film adaptations. Initial details were limited about the game, but the official site contained art, pictures of the team working on this game, forums, a wallpaper, and a designer's diary feature (which included, at first, only humorous "behind-the-scenes" videos which purported to share design details but which were "accidentally" out-of-focus or otherwise unintelligible. The website also contained a letter from the game's executive producer Steve Gray:

Included with the July 13, 2006 announcement was the information that since EA held the game development licenses to both Tolkien’s books and the New Line film trilogy, the game was to be based on both, like The Battle for Middle-earth II. Players were to be given the option to choose to play as either a Man, a Dwarf, an Elf or a Hobbit. The ultimate aim of the game was to become a hero allied with the White Council. The game was originally to be released late in 2007 on the PlayStation 3, Xbox 360 and PC. On February 2, 2007, however, it was announced that the game had been delayed indefinitely. This was said to be due to management problems. EA worked with Pandemic Studios to create The Lord of the Rings: Conquest instead on the same platforms, plus the Nintendo DS.

References

External links
 Delay announcement
 GameSpot – LOTR: The White Council

White Council
Cancelled PlayStation 3 games
Cancelled Windows games
Cancelled Xbox 360 games
Role-playing video games
Vaporware video games